In sports, topspin is a property of a shot where the ball rotates as if rolling in the same direction as it is moving.

Topspin or Top Spin may also refer to:

 Top Spin (film), a 2014 documentary on Olympic athletes
 Top Spin (ride), a thrill ride developed by HUSS Maschinenfabrik
 Top Spin (video game), a 2003 tennis video game
 Topspin (Transformers), several robot superhero characters in the Transformers robot superhero franchise.
 Topspin (comics), a Marvel Comics mutant
 Topspin Media, a marketing and e-commerce software platform for artists
 Topspin Communications, a computer networking company acquired by Cisco Systems

See also

 Spintop
 Tailspin (disambiguation)
 Topspinner (disambiguation)